M. Sylvia Donaldson (July 12, 1849 – June 15, 1937) was one of the first women elected to the Massachusetts House of Representatives. She was elected in 1924 at the age of seventy-three and served until 1930. Donaldson, a Republican, represented the tenth district (Plymouth/Brockton).

Life and career
Donaldson was born in Falmouth, Massachusetts on July 12, 1849. She studied to be a teacher at Boston University. She taught in the Brockton School District from 1873 to 1919 where she was principal and served on the school board.

In 1923, the first women, Donaldson and Susan Fitzgerald, were elected to the Massachusetts State Legislature. Donaldson served as honorary Speaker of the House on February 18, 1926. In addition to her work as a teacher and legislator, Donaldson was active in the Audubon Society, Daughters of the American Revolution, the National Education Association, League of Women Voters, and the Women's Civic Federation.

Stonehill College has created The Sylvia Donaldson Society for Women in Politics for female students at Stonehill College.

See also
 Massachusetts House of Representatives' 10th Plymouth district
 1923–1924 Massachusetts legislature
 1925–1926 Massachusetts legislature
 1927–1928 Massachusetts legislature
 1929–1930 Massachusetts legislature

References

1849 births
1937 deaths
People from Falmouth, Massachusetts
Republican Party members of the Massachusetts House of Representatives
Women state legislators in Massachusetts
Boston University School of Education alumni
Educators from Massachusetts
School board members in Massachusetts
19th-century American educators
20th-century American educators
20th-century American politicians
20th-century American women politicians
19th-century American women educators
20th-century American women educators